{{Infobox song
| name       = Rands and Nairas
| cover      =
| alt        =
| type       = single
| artist     = Emmy Gee featuring AB Crazy and DJ Dimplez
| album      =
| released   = 
| recorded   = 2013
| studio     =
| venue      =
| genre      = Hip hop
| length     = 
| label      = TeamTalkLess
| writer     = 
| producer   =
| chronology = Emmy Gee
| prev_title =
| prev_year  =
| next_title = ''Rands and Nairas (Remix)| next_year  = 2014
}}

"Rands and Nairas" is a song by Nigerian recording artist Emmy Gee featuring AB Crazy and DJ Dimplez. The song was produced by American producer Christian "Vybe Beatz" Arceo. It peaked at number 7 on South Africa's official music chart.

Accolades
"Rands and Nairas" won the Best Music Video of the Year award at the 2014 Nigeria Entertainment Awards. The music video for "Rands and Nairas" was nominated for Most Gifted Newcomer and Most Gifted Video of the Year at the 2014 Channel O Music Video Awards.

Charts
Weekly charts

Release history

Rands and Nairas (Remix)

"Rands and Nairas (Remix)'''" is a song by Nigerian recording artist Emmy Gee, featuring Ice Prince, Phyno, AB Crazy, Anatii, Cassper Nyovest and DJ Dimplez. It is a follow-up to his first single "Rands and Nairas". The song was produced by Christian "Vybe Beatz" Arceo with co production from Shizzi, and released under TeamTalkLess.

Release history

References

External links
 
 

2013 singles
2013 songs
2014 singles
Emmy Gee songs
Nigerian hip hop songs
Song recordings produced by Shizzi